Ubiratan D'Ambrosio (December 8, 1932 – May 12, 2021) was a Brazilian mathematics educator and historian of mathematics.

Life

D'Ambrosio was born in São Paulo, and earned his doctorate from the University of São Paulo in 1963. He retired as a professor of mathematics from the State University of Campinas, São Paulo, Brazil in 1993.

He was a member of many societies, including Pugwash, and served the International Commission on the History of Mathematics (ICHM) for five years. 

D'Ambrosio was also the founder of the Brazilian Society for Mathematics and History of the International Group of Ethnomathematicians. 

In 2001, he and Lam Lay Yong  were jointly awarded the Kenneth O. May Prize.

Writings

Books 
 1996, Educação Matemática: da teoria à prática.

Book chapters 
 1997, Ethno Mathematics. Challenging Eurocentrism, in Arthur B. Powell, Marilyn Frankenstein (eds.) Mathematics Education, State University of New York Press, Albany 1997, p. 13–24.
 Historiographical Proposal for Non-Western Mathematics, in Helaine Selin (ed.), Mathematics Across Cultures. The History of Non-Western Mathematics, Kluwer Academic Publishers, Dordrecht, 2000, pp. 79–92.

Articles 
 A Busca da paz como responsabilidade dos matemáticos. Cuadernos de Investigación y Formación en Educación Matemática 7 (2011)
 A Etnomatemática no processo de construção de uma escola indígena. Em aberto 63 (1994)

External links
Selected works

References

1932 births
2021 deaths
Historians of mathematics
20th-century Brazilian historians
University of São Paulo alumni
Academic staff of the State University of Campinas
People from São Paulo